WGMX (94.3 FM) is a radio station licensed to Marathon, Florida, United States.

History
The station originally went on the air in 1976 as WMUM, Stereo Island, and was owned by John and June Thacker. It was a Class A FM station on 94.3 Mhz and took the market by storm with its Easy Listening music format and limited commercial breaks, along with a fulltime local news department. The Thackers later bought local AM station, WFFG, and moved the FM operation to Boot Key, sharing studio and transmitter facilities.

The Thackers sold WMUM to Joe Nascone, who was from Pennsylvania and the call letters were changed to WGMX.

On June 8, 2011, WGMX changed their format from adult contemporary "Mix 94.3" to oldies, branded as "True Oldies".

On April 1, 2017, WGMX changed their format from oldies to classic hits, branded as "Mix 94.3". (info taken from stationintel.com)

The station was most recently owned by Jonathan Smith's Choice Radio Keys Corporation. Due to an inability to pay outstanding debts, the company assigned the licenses of WGMX and sister stations WFFG, WKEY-FM, and WKEZ-FM to a trustee on June 4, 2018, to be sold for the benefit of creditors. A sale of WGMX and WFFG to Joseph Nascone's The Great Marathon Radio Company was consummated on September 14, 2020, at a price of $35,000.

References

External links

GMX
1976 establishments in Florida
Radio stations established in 1976